The 2001–02 First League of the Federation of Bosnia and Herzegovina season was the second since its establishment.

League standings

External links
 RSSSF.org

First League of the Federation of Bosnia and Herzegovina seasons
Bosnia
2001–02 in Bosnia and Herzegovina football